Numerous polls of support for political parties in Ireland were taken between the 2016 general election and the 2020 general election, which was held on Saturday 8 February 2020. Opinion polls on voting intentions are conducted regularly.

The most frequent were commissioned by media organisations and were published on an approximately monthly basis by The Sunday Times (which uses Behaviour and Attitudes on an exclusive basis) and The Sunday Business Post (which uses the Red C polling company).

Less frequently polls were published by The Irish Times, the Sunday Independent, RTÉ, and others.

Graphical summary

Key polls
As methodologies and results differ, even where polls are taken over the same dates, the results of the two main polling companies are shown separately:

Sunday Business Post / Red C poll

The Sunday Times / B&A poll

National opinion polls
All opinion polls shown below were commissioned by print or broadcast media outlets, with the exception of the Survation poll conducted up to 2 February 2020, which was commissioned by Sinn Féin.

Preferred Taoiseach

Constituency opinion polls

Donegal

Galway West

Kerry

Footnotes

Opinion poll sources

2020 Irish general election
Opinion polling in the Republic of Ireland
Opinion polling for elections